The Sun Java System Portal Server is a component of the Sun Java Platform, Enterprise Edition, a software system that supports a wide range of enterprise computing needs.

Portal Server allows administrators and delegated administrators to build portal pages and to make them available to individuals throughout an enterprise according to user identities.

Portal Server's core framework supports the Java Specification Request (JSR) 168 and 286 Java Portlet specification standard and the Web Services for Remote Portlets (WSRP) 1.0 standard for portal content. Portlet developers can use the NetBeans IDE or open standard tools to build standards-based portlets.  Developers can also use design tools such as Dreamweaver to design new themes and skins.  Portal administrators can then leverage portlets, WSRP consumers, or additional portal tools for adding content to portal pages.

The latest version of Portal Server is 7.2.  This version provides a framework and a set of software modules that offer the following:

 Security
 Mobility
 Community Features
 Enterprise Search
 Identity-based content delivery
 Collaboration
 Business system integration
 Secure Remote Access
 Desktop Design Tool
 Delegated Administration
 Enterprise Edition Installer
 GlassFish V2 / Application Server 9.1 Support
 SharePoint Integrated Services
 AES Support for Secure Remote Access
 CMS Portlet and CMS Framework
 JSR286 / Portlet Container 2.0 Support
 WSRP 1.0
 Google Gadgets Integration
 Workflow API
 JSF Portlet Bridge 1.2
 NetBeans and Eclipse application development tools

OpenPortal
At JavaOne 2007, the Sun Java System Portal Server team announced the renaming of the portal open source community. It's now called the OpenPortal Community.

Partnership with Liferay
At JavaOne 2008, Sun and Liferay announced a strategic partnership that combines efforts and technologies from both companies' communities to enhance and maintain web aggregation and presentation technologies that are utilized in existing and future products. Liferay Portal 5 and Sun's Project WebSynergy are the first version of the new product families that are a result of this initiative and derived from the same codebase.

References

External links
 More about Sun Java System Portal Server
 Sun Java System Portal Server 7.2 documentation
 The Portal Post Blog
 The OpenPortal Community
 Portal Server SDN Hub
 Portal Server Demos Broken link
 Sun/Liferay partnership and WebSynergy
 Liferay Providing First Year Free for Sun Portal Customers

Java enterprise platform
Sun Microsystems software